Shimamono (島物 "island objects") is a generic term for Japanese tea utensils produced outside Japan, Korea and China, mainly from Southeast Asia.

History 
Items from Korea are referred to as kōraimono (高麗物) and from China called karamono (唐物) are not considered shimamono.

They were imported with ships on trade routes and started becoming popular in the 15th and 16th centuries. The term therefore can be taken literally to mean "island objects". By the time of the rule of the Shōgun Tokugawa Yoshimune, imitation shimamono were also produced in Japan. However, at this point they were called "striped objects", but the pronunciation remained the same. As such they can be counted as part of Japanese pottery and porcelain.

The treatise Tōkikō describes the Japanese pottery trade with Asia and gives detailed descriptions.

Types

See also 
 Special tea tools

References

Literature 

 https://books.google.com/books/about/Nanban_and_shimamono.html?id=PJghmwEACAAJ&redir_esc=y

Japanese pottery
Japanese tea utensils
Japanese words and phrases